Francisco Cervantes de Salazar (1514? – 1575) was a Spanish man of letters and rector of the Royal and Pontifical University of Mexico, founded in 1551.
 
He was born and raised in Toledo, Spain.  He first attended Alejo Venegas’s Grammar School and then studied at the University of Salamanca. In 1539 he accompanied Licenciado Pedro Giron to the Low Countries where he met Juan Luis Vives. In 1546 he published a collection of three works, Apólogo de la ociosidad y el trabajo by Luis Mejia, Introducción y camino de la sabiuduría by J. L. Vives, and Diálogo de la dignidad del hombre by Pérez de Oliva, which Cervantes completed by adding almost two-thirds to the original draft  by Oliva.

After spending the first part of his life in Spain, he went to Mexico around 1550, and lived there until his death. He had a successful academic career in the recently founded University of Mexico, and was appointed rector twice. He published a collection of Latin dialogues describing the city of Mexico in 1554   and left unfinished a chronicle of the  Mexican conquest (Crónica de la Nueva España, about 1560), which remained unpublished until 1914. Recently, it has been suggested that he may be the author of the first picaresque novel, La vida de Lazarillo de Tormes (1554).

References

External links

Catholic Encyclopedia article

1510s births
1575 deaths
People from Toledo, Spain
University of Salamanca alumni
Spanish male writers
Historians of Mesoamerica
16th-century Spanish historians
Aztec scholars
Spanish Mesoamericanists
Novohispanic Mesoamericanists
16th-century Mesoamericanists